Khalid Saleh Ghunaim Al-Ghunaim (1911 - 30 December 1990), is a former speaker of the Kuwaiti National Assembly, and the first speaker to preside over two consecutive terms of the National Assembly. He is the father of former minister Abdul Rahman Khalid Al-Ghunaim.

References 

Members of the National Assembly (Kuwait)
Speakers of the National Assembly (Kuwait)
1911 births
1990 deaths